The Stade Sylvio Cator is a multi-purpose stadium in Port-au-Prince, Haiti. It is currently used mostly for association football matches, and is turfed with artificial turf.

History
The stadium bears the name of Haitian Olympic medalist and footballer Sylvio Cator. It was named after him in 1952. Before then the stadium was called the Parc Leconte. and then the Stade Paul-Magloire. It is where the Haiti national football team play its home games. It has hosted the 1973 CONCACAF Championship, where the home team were crowned as champions and the 1991 CONCACAF Women's Championship where the final match between the USA and Canada reached overcapacity of 30,000.

The stadium was partly destroyed by the earthquake in Haiti in January 2010, and a tent-city sprouted within its confines.

References

Football venues in Haiti
Athletics (track and field) venues in Haiti
Buildings and structures in Port-au-Prince
Haiti
Multi-purpose stadiums